André Angelini (2 October 1856 – 16 June 1934) was a French sports shooter. He competed in two events at the 1908 Summer Olympics.

References

1856 births
1934 deaths
French male sport shooters
Olympic shooters of France
Shooters at the 1908 Summer Olympics
Place of birth missing